Monviel is a commune in the Lot-et-Garonne department in south-western France.

The population of Monviel in 2018 was 79. The town's area is 6.2 km².

See also
Communes of the Lot-et-Garonne department

References

Communes of Lot-et-Garonne